Woolner may refer to:

Woolner (surname) (which includes a list of persons with the surname)
Woolner, Northern Territory, a suburb of Darwin, Australia
Wulna language, an Australian language of the Darwin region

See also 
Woolner Brothers, an American film company